The Good Pope: Pope John XXIII (also known with the shorten titles The Good Pope and The Good Pope: John XXIII) is a 2003 Italian television film written and directed by Ricky Tognazzi. The film is based on real life events of Pope John XXIII.

Plot 

It is about the life of Pope John XXIII
Bob Hoskins stars as, Pope John XXIII, a man, humble origin who became one of the most influential Popes of the last century. Born Angelo Roncalli, in Sotto Il Monte in 1881, he was known for his profound spirituality as well as his extraordinary goodness from a young age. He was a farmer's son who influenced the world politics of the time; a man of modest character who revolutionised the church. He was pope during the most extraordinary chapter in history: the Cold War, the Berlin Wall and early space travel (Yuri Gagarin as the first such traveler in 1961). In his short time as pope, John XXIII touched the hearts of every creed and color. He was christened by the people as the 'good pope'. This story will help us understand why thousands flocked to Rome to join Pope John XXIII in his final hours and why millions around the world mourned his death.

Cast 
 Bob Hoskins as Angelo Giuseppe Roncalli
 Carlo Cecchi as Cardinal Mattia Carcano
 Roberto Citran as Loris Capovilla
 Fabrizio Vidale as young Angelo Roncalli
 Chiara Caselli as Carla
 Arnoldo Foà as Card. Alfredo Ottaviani
 Ricky Tognazzi as Mons. Giacomo Radini-Tedeschi
 Ivo Garrani as Cardinal Carcano (Mattia Carcano's Uncle)
 Erland Josephson as Franz von Papen
 Sergio Bustric as Guido Gusso
 Francesco Venditti as Young Nicola Catania
 John Light as Young Mattia Carcano
 Rolando Ravello as Cannava
 Francesco Carnelutti as Old Nicola Catania
 Lena Lessing as Marta Von Papen
 Enzo Robutti as Angelo's Grandfather

References

External links 
 

2003 television films
2003 films
Italian television films
2003 biographical drama films
Films set in the 20th century
Films set in Italy
Italian biographical drama films
Films about popes
Films directed by Ricky Tognazzi
Pope John XXIII
Films scored by Ennio Morricone
Cultural depictions of Franz von Papen
2000s Italian films